Antonio Ludeña (December 23, 1740 – March 1, 1820) was a Spanish Jesuit mathematician, physicist, and professor at the University of Camerino.

Works

References 

1740 births
1820 deaths
Spanish physicists
18th-century Spanish Jesuits
19th-century Spanish Jesuits
18th-century Spanish mathematicians
19th-century Spanish mathematicians
Academic staff of the University of Camerino